Tod Fennell (born October 18, 1984) is a Canadian film, voice, and television actor. He was born in Montreal, Quebec.

Career 
Fennell's passion for acting  inspired him to attend the Montreal Children's Theater at age five. He speaks English and French. 

Fennell had the lead in Nicholas Kendall's film Kayla (1997). Variety wrote about his performance: "In the central role, Fennell is memorable, managing to make the rather self-centered Sam interesting".

Fennell was a series regular on the children's television series Lassie (1997-1999).

Fennell portrayed Taro in the 2021 video game Kena: Bridge of Spirits.

Filmography

Film
Because Why (1993) - Zachary
Brainscan (1994) - Young Michael
Handel's Last Chance (1996) - Jamie O'Flaherty
Kayla (1997) - Sam Mackenzie
Ultimate G's: Zac's Flying Dream (2000) - Carl
Levity (2003)
The Reagans (2003) - Teenage Michael
End of the Line (2007) - Conrad
The Spiderwick Chronicles (2008) - Helen's Co-worker
Wushu Warrior (2008) - Jonathan Elders
Exploding Sun (2013) - Guard
Warm Bodies (2013) Armed Patrol (uncredited)
April and the Extraordinary World (2015) - Julius (voice)
Racetime (2019) - Piers (English version, voice)

Television
Million Dollar Babies (1994)
Are You Afraid of the Dark? Mark/Jim Gregory (episode: "The Tale of the Forever Game" & "The Tale of the Silver Light: Parts 1, 2, & 3")
Sirens (1995)
Lassie (1997–1999) - Jeff Mackenzie
My Hometown (1998)
Goosebumps (1998) - Billy Deep (episode: "Deep Trouble: Parts 1 & 2")
The Worst Witch (1998) - Spooky (episode: "Great Outdoors")
Big Wolf on Campus (2002) - Kyle (episode: "Thanks")	
Mental Block (2003) - McHattie
The 4400 (2007) - Troy Kennedy (episode: "Fear Itself")
The Festival
The Mysteries of Alfred Hedgehog
Blue Mountain State (2010) - Evan (episode "Rivalry Weekend")
The Art of More (2016) - Cliff Kerbis (episode "Hikor")
21 Thunder (2018)

Video Games
Kena: Bridge of Spirits (2021) - Taro
Monster Hunter Stories 2: Wings of Ruin (2021) - Cheval
Far Cry New Dawn (2019) - Bean
The Division 2 (2019) 
Ghost Recon Breakpoint (2019)
Assassin's Creed 3 (2012) - Mason Weems
Assassin's Creed 2 (2009) - Bernardo Baroncelli
Assassin's Creed: Rogue (2014) - George Washington

References

External links

1984 births
Living people
Canadian male film actors
Canadian male television actors
Male actors from Montreal
Anglophone Quebec people